Driffold is a small area of Sutton Coldfield in Birmingham, England. It forms the southeastern corner of Sutton Park around Wyndley Pool.

Areas of Birmingham, West Midlands